Andrea Wieland (born July 25, 1969) is a former field hockey goalkeeper from the United States, who was a member of the US Women's Team that claimed the fifth spot at the 1996 Summer Olympics in her birthplace Atlanta. She attended the University of Iowa, where she played for the Hawkeyes.

References

External links
 
 US Field Hockey
 Andrea Wieland, Ph.D., MBA

1969 births
Living people
American female field hockey players
Female field hockey goalkeepers
Iowa Hawkeyes field hockey players
Olympic field hockey players of the United States
Field hockey players at the 1996 Summer Olympics
Sportspeople from Atlanta